Dulal Panda (born 28 January 1964) is an Indian cell biologist and the chair professor at the department of biosciences and bioengineering of the Indian Institute of Technology, Bombay. Presently, he is the Director of NIPER, SAS Nagar (Mohali). Known for his studies on microtubule dynamics and FtsZ assembly dynamics, Panda is an elected fellow of the Indian Academy of Sciences and the National Academy of Sciences, India. The Department of Biotechnology of the Government of India awarded him the National Bioscience Award for Career Development, one of the highest Indian science awards, for his contributions to biosciences in 2005.

Biography 

Born on 28 January 1964, Dulal Panda did his doctoral studies at Bose Institute to earn a PhD in biochemistry in 1994 and subsequently, did his post-doctoral work at the University of California, Santa Barbara during 1998–2000 as a research associate. On his return to India, he joined the Indian Institute of Technology, Bombay in 2000 as an assistant professor at the School of Bioscience and Bioengineering and has been serving the institute since then. During this period, he became an associate professor in 2003 and a professor in 2007, and serves as a chair professor at the School of Bioscience and Bioengineering. In between, he was also associated with the scientific programs in life sciences of the Department of Science and Technology during 2003–04.

Panda resides in Powai, a neighborhood of Mumbai, in Maharashtra.

Legacy 

Panda's cell biological research covered the fields of eukaryotic and prokaryotic cell division, dynamics of microtubules and FtsZ, chemotherapeutic treatment protocols, development of FtsZ-targeted antibacterial drugs as well as biomolecular spectroscopy. His work on the dynamics of microtubules is known to have assisted in the development of anti-cancer and anti-fungal drugs and the research on FtsZ assembly has contributed to widening the understanding of their polymerization dynamics. He holds one patent for the development of an antibacterial drug and has four other patent applications pending approval. His studies have been documented by way of a number of articles and the online article repository of the Indian Academy of Sciences has listed 50 of them. Besides, he has contributed chapters to books published by others. He serves as the associate editor of BioMed Central of Springer Nature and was a member of the national committee of the 1st International Conference on Nutraceuticals and Chronic Diseases held in Kochi, Kerala in September 2016.

Awards and honors 
Dulal Panda received the Fogarty International Research Collaboration Award (FIRCA) of the John E. Fogarty International Center in 2001 and the Swarnajayathi Fellowship of the Department of Science and Technology in 2004. The Department of Biotechnology of the Government of India awarded him the National Bioscience Award for Career Development, one of the highest Indian science awards in 2005. He was chosen for the P. S. Sharma Memorial Award of the Society of Biological Chemists in 2007, the same year as he was selected as a member of Guha Research Conference. He received the S. C. Bhattacharya Award of IIT Bombay in 2009 and in 2010, he received two awards, the CDRI Award for Excellence in Drug Research of the Central Drug Research Institute and the Outstanding Research Investigator Award of the Science Research Council of the Department of Atomic Energy. The Council of Scientific and Industrial Research honored him with the G. N. Ramachandran Gold Medal in 2012.

Panda, who holds a TATA Innovation Fellowship of the Department of Biotechnology, was elected as a fellow by the National Academy of Sciences, India in 2005. He received the elected fellowship of the Indian Academy of Sciences in 2008.

Selected bibliography

Chapters

General articles

Scientific articles

See also 

 Cytoskeleton
 Tubulin

Notes

References

External links 

 

N-BIOS Prize recipients
Indian scientific authors
Living people
Fellows of the Indian Academy of Sciences
1964 births
Indian cell biologists
Indian molecular biologists
Indian patent holders
Fellows of The National Academy of Sciences, India
Academic staff of IIT Bombay
IIT Bombay alumni
University of California, Santa Barbara alumni
Scientists from Mumbai
21st-century Indian inventors